"College Life" is a popular song, first published in 1905 and written by Hery Frantzen. Today the most well-known version is by Billy Murray, who recorded a 1906 version for Victor Records which has entered the public domain.

References

1905 songs
Billy Murray (singer) songs